Barnabas Anthony Peter Latuheru (born 8 November 1965) is a Dutch retired professional footballer.

Personal life
He is of Moluccan heritage.

References

External links
 Player profile at Voetbal International
 Cv Bart Latuheru
 International career at Voetbalstats.nl

1965 births
Living people
AZ Alkmaar players
Dutch footballers
Dutch people of Moluccan descent
Excelsior Rotterdam players
Indo people
NEC Nijmegen players
Netherlands international footballers
People from Capelle aan den IJssel
SBV Vitesse players
Eredivisie players
Eerste Divisie players
Association football midfielders
Footballers from South Holland